John Bernard Ryan (November 12, 1868 – August 21, 1952) was a Major League Baseball catcher. He played from 1889 to 1913 in the American Association, National League and American League. He is one of only 29 players in baseball history to date to have appeared in Major League games in four decades.

Ryan was born in Haverhill, Massachusetts to Irish immigrants. He played baseball from an early age and began playing professionally by age 18.

He was a manager in the minor leagues in 1909–1911, 1922–1923, 1926, and 1928–1929.

See also
 List of Major League Baseball players who played in four decades

References

External links

1868 births
1952 deaths
19th-century baseball players
Major League Baseball catchers
Brooklyn Bridegrooms players
Boston Beaneaters players
Baltimore Orioles (NL) players
St. Louis Cardinals players
Washington Senators (1901–1960) players
Virginia Cavaliers baseball coaches
Louisville Colonels players
Minor league baseball managers
Buffalo Bisons (minor league) players
Columbus Senators players
Detroit Tigers (Western League) players
Jersey City Skeeters players
Kansas City Blues (baseball) players
Springfield Ponies players
Syracuse Stars (minor league baseball) players
Sportspeople from Haverhill, Massachusetts
Baseball players from Massachusetts
American people of Irish descent
Crisfield Crabbers players
New Bedford Millmen players